Pilão Cão is a settlement in the eastern part of the island of Maio in Cape Verde. In 2010 its population was 102. It is located 1 km south of Alcatraz and 14 km northeast of the island capital Porto Inglês.

See also
List of villages and settlements in Cape Verde

References
 

Villages and settlements in Maio, Cape Verde